Brown is a lunar impact crater that is located in the southeast part of the Moon, to the southwest of the prominent ray crater Tycho. Northwest of Brown is the crater Wilhelm, and to the west is Montanari. This crater was named after Ernest William Brown, and is distinct from crater D. Brown, a satellite crater of the Apollo crater.

The rim of Brown is mis-shapen from a typical circular formation, most notably due to the intrusion of the satellite crater Brown E into the southeast of the formation. The northern rim is polygonal in shape, with a flattened northern rim. There is also a small gap in the western rim which protrudes to the west.

Satellite craters
There are eight satellite craters of Brown that are recognized by the International Astronomical Union. The official designation of these features was approved in 2006.

References

External links
 

Impact craters on the Moon